Presidential elections were held in South Korea in December 1972 following the promulgation of the Yushin Constitution, which created the National Conference for Unification, a body whose functions included being an electoral college for presidential elections. Incumbent President Park Chung-hee claimed that Western-style liberal democracy would bring more chaos to the economically struggling nation than it could afford. In contrast, he argued that the Yushin system created a "Korean-style democracy" with a strong, unchallenged presidency. He argued this system was necessary to keep the country stable.

National Conference for Unification election 
The 2,359 members of the first National Conference for Unification were elected to their six-year term on 5 December 1972, with a voter turnout of 70%. All candidates were required to run as independents. The Constitution gave the body many powers, such as forming policies related to inter-Korean relationship, and determining the president as well as one-third of the National Assembly. However, the body was little more than a figurehead, as all of its actions were controlled by the president.

The newly sworn-in members of the National Conference for Unification convened on 23 December to elect Park to a fourth term as president. With no opposition candidates, Park was elected with the support of 2,357 out of the 2,359 delegates. The elections were regarded as a formality.

Presidential election
In order to be elected, a candidate had to receive the vote of over 50% of the incumbent members of the National Council for Unification. With 2,359 delegates in office, Park had to receive at least 1,180 votes to be elected. He received 2,357 votes, 99.92% of the total possible.

As there was only one candidate registered, the only way the deputies could vote against Park was by casting invalid ballots. One of the two deputies who did that, Song Dong-heon from Daejeon-1 District, revealed later in his life that he purposefully wrote "박정의" (Park Chung-ee) instead of "박정희" (Park Chung-hee) on his ballot in order to protest the dictatorial regime.

References

1972 elections in South Korea
Presidential elections in South Korea
Single-candidate elections